The Clerkenwell Crime Syndicate, also known as the Adams Family or the A-Team, is a
criminal organisation, allegedly one of the most powerful in the United Kingdom. Media reports have  credited them with wealth of up to £200 million.

Background

The syndicate was based in Clerkenwell while Terry Adams, until his admission of money laundering in 2007, had lived in Barnsbury. The syndicate expanded over years to include other members of the Adams family and close childhood friends. 

The gang is allegedly heavily involved in drug trafficking and extortion as well as the hijacking of gold bullion shipments and security fraud. They have been linked to 25 gangland murders of informants and rival criminals. In addition to developing alleged connections to Metropolitan Police officials, they were also stated to have had a British Conservative MP in their pocket at one point.

The shooting of the then 68-year-old "Mad" Frankie Fraser, a former enforcer for The Richardson Gang, in July 1991 was said to have been ordered by the Adams family — though Fraser said he had been targeted by rogue police.  The family is believed to have connections with various criminal organisations, specifically with South American drug cartels.

The BBC has asserted that their influence decreased from 2000 onwards.  Police officers, speaking off-record to British newspapers, have said that the family has been credited with acts that they simply did not carry out and this could be true given the number of alleged key gang members killed or imprisoned. However the Metropolitan Police took the Adams' alleged crimes sufficiently seriously to consider the need to involve a CPS-lead team of detectives and the Security Service (MI5) in order to crack the Adams mafia-like organised crime cartel.

Tommy Adams was imprisoned for his involvement in money laundering and a drugs plot that was described as not having been sanctioned by his brothers. During an 18-month bugging operation by MI5, Terry Adams was recorded speaking about his brother in very strident terms and suggesting that, in 1998 at least, relations between them were kept to a minimum.  It has been stated that they have a criminal fortune of up to £200 million.

Before Tommy and Terry Adams were convicted in 1998 and 2007 respectively, the failure of the police to secure convictions against them had led to a belief that they had undermined the justice system to become untouchables. Police, Crown Prosecution Service staff and jurors were said to have been bribed and intimidated leading to not-guilty verdicts against members of the gang that were said to be wrong.

The gang's alleged leader, Terry Adams, has been serving a prison sentence since February 2007, and two of his brothers are under surveillance by the Serious Organised Crime Agency and police in Spain, making other criminals reluctant to do business with them. It has been said that Terry Adams faces severe financial difficulties having been ordered, in May 2007, to repay £4.7 million in legal aid and pay prosecution costs of £800,000.

Sean "Tommy" Adams gained high-profile public attention during a trial in 2004, when he was described as having attended a meeting in 2002 at the request of the former football international Kenny Dalglish. Dalglish was a major shareholder in Wilmslow-based sports agency Pro Active, a leading sports management firm headed up by local businessman Paul Stretford. Dalglish was reported to have hired Adams during a protracted deal to secure Pro Active's exclusive management rights to Manchester United, and England football, striker Wayne Rooney, in circumstances where another company claimed to represent Rooney.

In February 2010 a 38-year-old man, claiming to be Terry Adams' nephew, was convicted in a case known as the jigsaw murder: the trial revealed that the man, Stephen Marshall, had disposed four bodies for the Adamses. He was sentenced to at least 36 years in prison.

In 2014, Sean "Tommy" Adams and 13 other people believed to be affiliated with the Clerkenwell Crime Syndicate were arrested in a police operation codenamed "Octopod." Designer watches, six shotguns and large sums of money were found in other addresses across the city, with a concentration in north London. The arrests were linked to conspiracy to assault, money laundering, fraud and revenue offences.

At the time, in December 2014, of the death of a bankrupt businessman Scot Young, who had been involved in 2013 in a high-profile divorce case, media reports that flagged Young's involvement with Patrick Adams asserted that Tommy Adams and Michael Adams faced no charges after their arrest earlier in 2014.

Personnel and members
Personnel and members of the Clerkenwell crime syndicate include:

Terry Adams
Terence George Adams was born 18 October 1954 in London.

His downfall came with the assistance of MI5 and the Inland Revenue. MI5, in a unique inter-departmental collaboration the first of its kind after the Cold War ended, played a leading part in the electronic war against organised crime—and turned its sights on Adams's international criminal cartel. Police and MI5 set up a secret squad to dismantle the Adams organisation, directed from an anonymous Hertfordshire address inside a secret bunker sited somewhere on the busy Hoddesdon commuter belt into London.  Some of the recordings made over a period of 18 months suggested that Adams had retired from front line involvement in crime in 1990. 

Police sources believe Adams knew he was being monitored and had "stage managed" many conversations for the benefit of his defence. He, for example, was allegedly caught on tape, in 1998, telling his adviser Solly Nahome that he did not want to be involved with a particular illegal deal, which would affect his legitimate business. The Inland Revenue was suspicious enough to ask Adams to explain how he had amassed his personal fortune including his £2 million house and his collection of valuable antiques. Adams invented a range of unlikely occupations, including jeweller and public relations executive. Transcripts of the surveillance and investigations into several front companies Adams set up proved he was lying. 

He was arrested in April 2003 detectives found art and antiques valued at £500,000, £59,000 in cash and jewellery worth more than £40,000 in his home. On 9 March 2007 at a hearing at the Old Bailey, Andrew Mitchell QC summed up the prosecution's case in saying, "It is suggested that Terry Adams was one of the country’s most feared and revered organised criminals. He comes with a pedigree, as one of a family whose name had a currency all of its own in the underworld. A hallmark of his career was the ability to keep his evidential distance from any of the violence and other crime from which he undoubtedly profited." The former Scottish gangster Paul Ferris asserted that none of the brothers is primus inter pares (first among equals or in sole charge).

On 18 May 2007 Adams was ordered to pay £4.8 million in legal fees to three law firms who had initially represented him under the UK's free legal aid scheme. He was also required to pay £800,000 in prosecution costs. 

He admitted a single specimen money-laundering offence on 7 February 2007, and was jailed for seven years; he was released on 24 June 2010, but was recalled to prison in August 2011 for breaching his licence. Also, on 21 May 2007, he was ordered to file reports of his income for the next ten years. Open case files remain untried on Operation Trinity records and rumour still exists that several further prosecutions may eventually come to trial.

Release from prison
Adams was released from prison on 24 June 2010.

In August 2011 he appeared before City of London Magistrates court charged with 8 breaches of his Financial Reporting Order imposed upon him in 2007.

District Judge Quentin Purdy said he was "shrewd and calculating"...You wilfully and, in my judgment, arrogantly sought to frustrate the effect of a financial reporting order, well knowing that a significant confiscation order remains largely unpaid."

In July 2014 Adams appeared before a High Court judge in London where he claimed that he was penniless and living in a one bedroom apartment. Adams was ordered to pay £650,000 under the Proceeds of Crime Act.

Jewellery design
In 2011, after his release from prison, Adams started working in Hatton Garden as a jewellery designer.

Fashion
In July 2014, having left a £25,000-per-year job designing jewellery in Hatton Garden, Terry Adams started working on a menswear collection for his newly launched fashion label N1 Angel named after the area where he was born. Later that year he made an appearance at the London Fashion Week where his collection was displayed. His fashion label's website states:

Court battle
In March 2017 Adams lost his appeal against the order to pay £700,000 under the Proceeds of Crime Act.  In November 2017 a district judge sitting in Weston-super-Mare ordered Terry Adams to pay the remaining amount within 30 days or return to prison for at least 2.5 years.  In December 2017 Adams repaid the entire confiscation order (around £725,000) despite his repeated claims of poverty. He also attempted to gag the press to stop people knowing that he had repaid the confiscation rather than return to jail.  A source close to the investigation said that he must have found nearly three-quarters of a million pounds "down the back of the sofa."

In February 2019, media reports suggested that Terry Adams and his wife were living in a housing association flat. Later that month Terry Adams paid back an additional £50,000 to Westminster Magistrates Court despite claiming poverty to avoid returning to prison for non payment of court costs.

Tommy Adams
Thomas Sean Adams (born in 1958 in London) grew up in a criminal family together with older siblings Terry and Patsy and committed his first robbery when he was 14. He is best known for operating a protection racket for brothels and nightclubs in the West End of London. Adams has a lot of Jewish friends and associates who are active in the North London Jewish community and is himself a follower of Judeo-Christian faith. Starting out as an armed robber, he worked his way up the criminal career and was involved in West End protection rackets together with his brothers.

Early life

As a child, Tommy Adams suffered  from asthma and was taken to the emergency room at the University College Hospital almost weekly due to him waking up unable to breathe. He was raised as an Irish Catholic but became disillusioned with the faith when he was 12 years old after an incident with his mother. She told him that Irish Catholics are taught to be self-sufficient and that their official doctrine teaches not to engage in robbery, and refused to accept the groceries Adams stole from a high street shop in Islington. Before leaving home, he told his mother he believed himself to be the incarnation of the devil and tried to stab her when she was asleep.

In 1972, when he was aged just 14, he started robbing people in Islington with his pet Staffordshire bull terrier by his side in what became known as the Islington dog robberies of the 70's. Having come from a working class family of 11 siblings, he turned to robbery as a way to get out of poverty. His first was a wallet theft in Angel, Islington which made him £10 (which equals £197 in 2023) which he used to buy a new leather dog collar for his dog, and a pair of Adidas trainers for himself. By the end of the year, he attended school just to rob people and was robbing on average three people per day.

Children

On 2 November 2017 Tommy Adams' son of a Jewish-Cypriot origin, Shaun George Adams (born February 1985) of Claremont Square, Islington, pleaded guilty to money laundering admitting using a forged pay slip to get a £231,000 mortgage to buy the lease on a pub in Marylebone.
He received a six months sentence, suspended for a year. Until his arrest in 2017 he successfully operated a close protection racket together with his father from a night club in Soho where he worked as a manager until February 2022 when he opened a property consultancy business SGA Consulting he runs from his Islington flat in Claremont Square which was used as the filming location for 35 Portland Row in the Netflix adaption of Lockwood & Co.

In 2009 Adams met an Irish solicitor Anne-Marie Hutchinson OBE of Dawson Cornwall Solicitors in Hatton Garden, Holborn who until her death in October 2020, was instructed to advice him in matrimonial matters, specifically in contact arrangements with his son Sean Patrick who was born in 2011 and lived at 33 Portland Place where he was being raised by a nanny until 2014. Adams kept the matter secret from his family as it was highly embarrassing for him because the mother of the child was 30 years younger than him, and of the same age as his youngest son Shaun.

Property investments
Despite investing millions in properties and having several children with different women, Tommy Adams continued living on his own in a one bedroom council flat near the family's traditional Islington base and having beans on toast for dinner. 
In 1980s Adams made a lot of money on drug trafficking, robbery and operating a protection racket but lost around £1.5 million in the early 2000s after a string of poor investments, one of those being the purchase of 33 Portland Place, a 24 bedroom Robert Adam mansion located in the West End which was acquired by Adams jointly with Lord Edward Davenport who used it as his personal residence whilst Adams himself lived on a council estate. 33 Portland Place was used as a filming location for the Oscar winning film The King's Speech which tells a story about King George VI's life after learning to manage a stuttering condition he developed during his youth.

In 2001 Tommy Adams met a high society socialite and a night club owner Lord Edward Davenport, and started charging him money for protection racket after threatening to smash up his nightclub in Chelsea. By 2005, after being friends with Davenport for a considerable amount of time, Adams begun to trust him and agreed to go 50/50 with him on a £3 million freehold purchase deal, putting £1.5 million of his money into purchase of the freehold of 33 Portland Place which made him a co-owner of the property.
Having acquired the freehold of the building with funds from the Adams family, Davenport used 33 Portland Place as his private residence and used it as a nightclub, whilst Tommy Adams, being a resident of a council estate in Islington, was not invited to Davenport's high society events because he wore a shell suit with trainers, did not own a shirt or a tie and had a reputation of a thug.

In 2014 Tommy Adams met businessman Dave Sullivan, the producer of The Rise of the Krays, who offered to buy 33 Portland Place for £25 million. Davenport used the money to pay off the compensation order imposed by the Serious Fraud Office (SFO), which left him with £12 million profit.

Patrick Cox fashion brand
 

In 2008, Tommy Adams lent £2.5 million of his family's money to Lord Edward Davenport to invest it in acquisition of the fashion label of Irish celebrity shoe designer Patrick Cox. This was again not sanctioned by his brothers and kept secret from the rest of his family. Patrick Cox was deceived by Davenport who offered a substantial amount of money to purchase the rights to his brand but after signing off the rights to Davenport never received the funds. After acquiring the rights to Patrick Cox brand, Lord Davenport kept the £2.5 million and moved the stock from Cox’s Chelsea studio to 33 Portland Place and kept the designer shoes for himself. He never gave Adams a pair nor paid back the funds Adams lent him to acquire the brand. 
Davenport enjoyed wearing expensive Patrick Cox shoes, however Adams never wore them as they did not match up with his tracksuit.  Having acquired the rights and the stock, Davenport tried to make licensing deals abroad using the Patrick Cox name without Patrick Cox's approval.

Brink's MAT Gold robbery
Tommy Adams was charged with involvement in the handling of Brink's-MAT gold bullion but in 1985 was cleared of involvement in the laundering of the proceeds during a high-profile Old Bailey trial with co-defendant Kenneth Noye.

Drug trafficking
Tommy Adams is suspected of establishing connections to other international criminal organisations including numerous Yardie gangs as well as gaining an $80 million credit line from Colombian drug cartels. In 1998, Adams was convicted of masterminding a £8 million hashish smuggling operation into Britain for which he was jailed for seven years. At trial he was also ordered to pay an unprecedented £6 million criminal assets embargo, or face an additional five years' imprisonment on top of his seven-year term.

Money laundering
Tommy was further convicted of money laundering and sentenced to 7 years in 2017 after a number of significant cash seizures of criminal money were linked to him. Money from crime in Manchester was collected and sent to Tommy via trusted associates.
In 2022 Adams was released from prison after settling the confiscation order of over a million pounds. 
In a confiscation hearing on 27 February 2020, Adams had his available assets determined by the Judge to be £1,243,270.75 and a Confiscation Order was made against him for that sum. He was convicted for running a money laundering operation with his associates, which was foiled in 2014 when undercover police heard him discussing the illicit activity at a central London café in Hatton Garden. He was defended by Jewish solicitor Jonathan Zeckler of Zeckler & Co solicitors of Holloway Road, Islington.

Patsy Adams
Patrick Daniel John Adams was born 2 February 1956 in London. In 2016 Adams was sentenced to 9 years imprisonment for wounding a police informant during a fight outside his home in Islington.

Childhood
Adams was brought up the Sixties in the Barnsbury area of Islington, North London. He comes from a very poor working class family from Northern Ireland and is one of 11 children. As a child, growing up in poverty he used to steal food from the school buffet and from the market stalls in Islington. His father George Adams worked as a lorry driver in 1960s and later as a mechanic at a Jaguar dealership in North West London. Adams' mother Florence was a housewife who devoted herself to family and to Irish Catholicism. In the Sixties Islington where Adams was brought up was a rough area. In 1964 when Adams was aged 8 he had to started carrying a knife to school for self-defence. Convictions included stealing a Christmas Turkey from a carvery in Islington on Christmas Day and robbing a festive gift shop on New Year’s Eve.

Youth
After his release from prison in 1975, having seven years for armed robbery offences, Adams opened several legitimate businesses. One of these was a divan bed delivery company. In the late 70s he began selling waterbeds when he realised that those started becoming popular in England and by 1976 were in high demand.  In 1978, when Adams was 22 years old, he sold his waterbed business and opened one of the first Pinball arcades in London. By 1980s when still in his youth, Adams began to develop reputation as one the most violent figures of London’s underworld. In 1982 he cut off 
part of Frankie Fraser son's ear during a fallout over a drug deal which angered the Krays. During his imprisonment he got into fitness, used the gym regularly and developed a good physique. He was feared by inmates in his prison wing after a number of fights. His 1984 conviction for carrying firearms and wearing a full body armour in a public place ended in a 3 year prison sentence.

Lotus Carlton 40RA
 In January 1994 Adams was investigated in connection with theft of Lotus Carlton 40 RA, a 377-horsepower high performance saloon car with a top speed of 176mph which was used to raid petrol stations and jewelry shops and was last seen when chased by the police driving at the speed of 150mph northbound, up the M6 towards Scotland. On 26 November 1993 a Lotus Carlton registered "40 RA" was reported stolen from a home in the West Midlands. In the following months, a gang of thieves used the car to conduct ram raids on petrol stations and jewelry shops, stealing around £20,000 worth of jewelry. The car was never recovered and no charges were brought against him.

Relocation to Spain
In 1990s, when Adams was still in his 30s, upon his release from prison for possession of firearms and ammunition, Adams abandoned crime and relocated to Spain where he bought several properties and formed a legitimate property business.

His last imprisonment in 1984 devastated his wife  who begged him to leave crime and move abroad as she did not want him to get dragged into another conspiracy by his friends in London and go to prison again. Adams left crime and went straight for 30 years, until his arrest in 2013.

Going on a run
In 2013 Police launched a covert operation against Adams after circulating him as wanted in connection with shooting of a police informant in Islington, North London, and fleeing the country.

2015 Interpol arrest

Adams was arrested in Amsterdam on 7 August 2015 during a complex surveillance operation involving face recognition technology and satellites. He was sentenced to nine years imprisonment having admitted shooting Paul Tiernan with a .45 calibre pistol in December 2013. Adams, together with his wife was charged in October 2015 with attempted murder and possession of a firearm with intent to endanger life. The murder charge was dropped after Teirnan refused to cooperate with police.

Imprisonment at HMP Belmarsh
On 3rd December 2016 Adams started a nine-year jail sentence as the only Category AA prisoner in notorious maximum security HMP Belmarsh where he was on the same wing with Julian Assange who he met during a daily jog in the exercise yard. After becoming friends with Assange, Adams became a supporter of the Anonymous movement and campaigned for freedom of speech.

Imprisonment at HMP Frankland
In 2017, a year after having been convicted of wounding Paul Teirnan, Patrick Adams was moved to HMP Frankland where he became the only category AAA prisoner due to being deemed a high flight risk and dangerous. He was placed on the same wing with Peter Sutcliffe who he became friendly with. His wife became concerned about Adams as she considered Peter Sutcliffe a bad influence because Sutcliffe was friends with the blonde woman who Adams became interested in and later requested to be put in touch with her after seeing her picture on Sutcliffe’s cell. Due to being category AAA prisoner Adams was not allowed to have a phone in his cell and could not call her. Instead, they exchanged love letters. She later came to visit him but it did not go any further.

George Adams
Member of the notorious Adams family and son of Patsy Adams, George Adams has burglary and firearm related convictions dating back to 2010 when he was only 21 years old.

Burglary
In November 2010, aged 21, George Adams was arrested stealing £2,000 of stock from Zee & Co boutique in Upper Street, Islington. He later admitted a charge of burglary at Blackfriars Crown Court. It was his first criminal offence. Adams cut through metal security bars and forced open a rear window in order to break into the shop. He was handed a six-month sentence suspended for two years and was also given a one-year supervision order and told to pay compensation.

Bar fight
In October 2015 George Adams, aged 32, was involved in an Upper Street bar fight not far from his house, in which a man was stabbed in the face and two others were slashed in the face with a knife. Adams met a woman at the bar and trying to chat her up, he ordered a dry martini for her and added "make it shaken, not stirred." After having her Martini the woman complained to her male friends who were nearby about receiving unwanted attention from Adams and called him a thug. A fight broke out and friends of Adams attacked her three friends who were later taken to hospital, where they received stitches for their injuries. Adams pled guilty and was given a nine month sentence, suspended for 12 months.

Shooting
In June 2017 George Adams was involved in a shooting at his flat where Danis Salih who owed him £200,000 was wounded during a shooting.  Danis Salih, 44, armed with a gun, came to George Adams place in Islington to settle the £200.000 debt but could not pay up. A gunfight between Danis and George ensued and Danis was shot and wounded. Having searched Danis' home the police found 8mm bullets and drugs. Danis was later arrested for possession of ammunition without a firearms certificate and possession of cocaine and other drugs recovered by police from his home. Danis admitted possession of ammunition without a firearms certificate and possession of 27 tablets of Alprazolam, 26.9 grams of cannabis, 3.02 grams of cocaine and 1.83 grams of opium. He was sentenced to nine months on the ammunition and one month concurrent on each of the drugs offences suspended for 21 months.

Connections to other gangsters
The Adams family have long been connected to the Brink's-Mat robbery and other individuals who helped sell the stolen gold, including Kenneth Noye

In popular culture
The Adams family is said to have inspired the Gangs of London (TV series)

See also

 British firms (organised crime)
 Crime in the United Kingdom
 Extortion
 Organized crime
 Pizzo (extortion)
 Racket (crime)
 Transparency International
 Triad (organized crime)

References

Footnotes

Works cited

 
 
 
 
 
 
 
 
 
 
 
 
 
 

Organizations established in the 1980s
1980s establishments in England
Organised crime gangs of London
Organised crime groups in Spain
Irish Mob
20th-century English criminals
Criminals from London
English criminals
English expatriates in Spain
English prisoners and detainees
People from the London Borough of Islington
1980s crimes in London
1980s in the City of Westminster
English male criminals
Living people
People from Clerkenwell
Irish secret societies
Secret societies related to organized crime
Organized crime by ethnic or national origin
Year of birth missing (living people)